The Cross-Strait Forum may be:

 Cross-Strait Economic, Trade and Culture Forum, started in 2006
 Cross-Strait Peace Forum, started in 2013
 Straits Forum, started in 2009